The discography of Death Angel, an American thrash metal band, consists of nine studio albums, one EP, two live albums, two compilation albums, seven singles, ten music videos and two demo cassettes. Death Angel was formed in the San Francisco Bay Area in 1982 by guitarists Rob Cavestany and Gus Pepa, bassist Dennis Pepa and drummer Andy Galeon. The lead vocalist position was originally filled by Dennis Pepa, until Mark Osegueda became the band's permanent singer in 1984.

After releasing two demo tapes, Heavy Metal Insanity (1983) and Kill as One (1985), the band signed with the independent label Enigma Records and released its debut full-length album, The Ultra-Violence, in 1987, followed a year later by Frolic through the Park (1988); both albums were minor successes in the United States and Europe. In 1989, Death Angel signed with Geffen Records, and released its only album for the major label, Act III, in the following year. Act III failed to chart in the United States, but enjoyed some success in Europe, including France, Belgium and Switzerland.

Death Angel's first live album, Fall from Grace, was also released in 1990, but did not appear on any charts. In 1991, the band broke up, due to Galeon seriously injured from a bus accident, but reformed ten years later with a new lineup. Death Angel subsequently signed to the German independent label Nuclear Blast, and released The Art of Dying, their first studio album in 14 years, in 2004. The band has since released five more studio albums and one EP.

Studio albums

EPs

Compilation albums

Live albums

Demo albums

Singles

Music videos

Other appearances 
Metallic Attack: Metallica – The Ultimate Tribute album ("Trapped Under Ice") (2004)
Alone in the Dark movie soundtrack ("The Devil Incarnate") (2005)
Metal Swim – Adult Swim compilation album ("Truce") (2010)

Videography 
Sonic German Beatdown – Live in Germany (DVD, 2009)

References 

Heavy metal group discographies
Discographies of American artists